Ensay may refer to:
Ensay, Mull, a place on the Isle of Mull, Argyll and Bute, Scotland
Ensay, Outer Hebrides, a privately owned island in the Outer Hebrides
Ensay, Victoria, a town in Victoria, Australia